Eufaula City School District  is a school district in Barbour County, Alabama.

External links
 

School districts in Alabama
Education in Barbour County, Alabama